General elections were held in Guam on November 7, 2006, in order to elect the governor, all 15 seats in the Legislature and the federal delegate. There was also a double referendum on legalise slot machines at racing tracks and raising the age at which citizens could purchase and consume alcohol to 21.

Whilst Felix Perez Camacho of the Republican Party was re-elected as governor, the Democratic Party won a majority of seats in the legislature. Madeleine Bordallo was re-elected as the territory's federal delegate, whilst both referendum questions were rejected.

Background
In Guam, elections to the legislature and multi-member boards are run via open primary (This following the outlawing of the previous blanket primary similar to Louisiana.

Both the Public Auditor and Consolidated Commission on Utilities are required to be nonpartisan and as such candidates are not allowed to state affiliations or list them on the ballot.

In the case of the auditor, affiliating with a party is grounds for disqualification.

Candidates for Governor

Democratic
Former Guam Delegate Robert A. Underwood. Previously served as Congressman from January 4, 1993, until January 6, 2003.
Senator Frank Aguon, Jr. is Underwood's running mate.
Former governor Carl Gutierrez. Previously served as governor for two terms from January 2, 1995, until January 6, 2003.
Senator Benjamin Cruz is Gutierrez running mate.

Republican
Current governor Felix Perez Camacho. 
Senator Michael Cruz is Camacho's running mate.
Current lieutenant governor Kaleo Moylan. 
Senator Francis E. Santos is Moylan's running mate.

Legislative candidates

Democratic candidates
Tina Muña Barnes (I)
Jose Chargualaf
David Ralph Duenas
Judith P. Guthertz
Romeo M. Hernandez
Adolpho B. Palacios Sr. (I)
Vicente "Ben" Pangelinan (I)
Don Parkinson
Rory J. Respicio (I)
David L.G. Shimizu
Angel R. Sablan
Angela L.G. Santos
Jose "Pedo" Terjale
Judith T. Won Pat (I)

Defeated in primary
Robert L.G. Benavente
Ivan Borja Carbullido 
Vicente U. Garrido
Alejandro Gay
Sedfrey M. Linsangan
Elwin Champaco Quitano
Trinidad "Trini" T. Torres

Republican candidates
Frank F. Blas Jr.
Eddie Baza Calvo (I)
Christopher M. Duenas
Jim Espaldon
Speaker Mark Forbes (I)
Victor Anthony Gaza
Frankie "Frank" Ishizaki
Jesse Anderson Lujan (I)
Joseph F. Mesa
Shirley "Sam" Mabini-Souza
Telo Teresa Taitague
Ray Tenorio (I)
Antonio "Tony" R. Unpingco (I)

Withdrew
Flora Baza Quan

Attorney General 
Three candidates are seeking election as attorney general, Alicia Limtiaco, Douglas Moylan, and Vernon Gumataotao Perez.

Consolidated Commission on Utilities 
Ten candidates are seeking election as CCU will take three seats.

 Joana Margaret C. Blas
 Harold J. Cruz
 Luis A. De Vera
 Luis P. Duenas
 Eloy Perez Hara 
 Benigno Manibusan Palomo (I)
 Simon A. Sanchez II (I)
 Everett D. Spidell

Primary election

Governor

Legislature

Republicans did not appear on the ballot because there was no need for a Republican primary with less than 15 candidates running for legislature.

Attorney General

General Election

Delegate to House of Representatives

Legislature

Attorney General

Consolidated Commission on Utilities

Referendums

Raising the age for alcohol consumption

Legalising slot machines

References

2006
2006 Guam elections
General election
Guam
November 2006 events in the United States
2007 referendums
2006
2006